Pasquotank County is a county located in the U.S. state of North Carolina. As of the 2020 census, the population was 40,568. Its county seat is Elizabeth City. The county was originally created as Pasquotank Precinct and gained county status in 1739. Pasquotank County is part of the Elizabeth City, NC Micropolitan Statistical Area, which is also included in the Virginia Beach-Norfolk, VA-NC Combined Statistical Area.

Geography

It is the fifth-smallest county in North Carolina by land area.

Almost all of the terrain in Pasquotank County is flatland with a topography near sea level, a characteristic of most of North Carolina's Coastal Plain. The county is flanked by two rivers: the Pasquotank and the Little River.

National protected area 
 Great Dismal Swamp National Wildlife Refuge (part)

Major water bodies 
 Albemarle Sound
 Big Flatty Creek
 Intracoastal Waterway
 Little River
 Newbegun Creek
 Pasquotank River

Adjacent counties
 Tyrrell County - south
 Camden County - east
 Perquimans County - southwest
 Gates County - northwest

Major highways
  (Concurrency with US 17)

Major infrastructure 
 Elizabeth City Regional Airport

Demographics

2020 census

As of the 2020 United States census, there were 40,568 people, 14,697 households, and 9,829 families residing in the county.

2010 census
As of the census of 2010, there were 40,661 people, 13,907 households, and 9,687 families residing in the county. The population density was 154 people per square mile (59/km2). There were 14,289 housing units at an average density of 63 per square mile (24/km2). The racial makeup of the county was 56.7% White, 37.8% Black or African American, 0.3% Native American, 1.1% Asian, 0.0% Pacific Islander, 1.8% from other races, and 2.2% from two or more races. 4.0% of the population were Hispanic or Latino of any race.

There were 12,907 households, out of which 33.4% had children under the age of 18 living with them, 50.4% were married couples living together, 16.3% had a female householder with no husband present, and 29.5% were non-families. 25.4% of all households were made up of individuals, and 11.4% had someone living alone who was 65 years of age or older. The average household size was 2.52 and the average family size was 3.01.

In the county, the population was spread out, with 24.9% under the age of 18, 11.3% from 18 to 24, 28.4% from 25 to 44, 21.3% from 45 to 64, and 14.1% who were 65 years of age or older. The median age was 36 years. For every 100 females there were 93.8 males. For every 100 females age 18 and over, there were 90.1 males.

The median income for a household in the county was $30,444, and the median income for a family was $36,402. Males had a median income of $30,072 versus $21,652 for females. The per capita income for the county was $14,815. 18.4% of the population and 15.5% of families were below the poverty line. Out of the total people living in poverty, 25.5% are under the age of 18 and 17.9% are 65 or older.

Government and politics
Pasquotank County is a member of the Albemarle Commission regional council of governments.

Education
Schools in Pasquotank county include College of the Albemarle, Elizabeth City State University, and Mid-Atlantic Christian University.

Communities

City
 Elizabeth City (county seat and largest city)

Unincorporated communities
 Nixonton
 Weeksville

Townships
 Elizabeth City
 Mount Hermon
 Newland
 Nixonton
 Providence
 Salem

See also
 List of counties in North Carolina
 National Register of Historic Places listings in Pasquotank County, North Carolina
 List of future Interstate Highways

References

External links

 
 

 
Elizabeth City, North Carolina micropolitan area
1739 establishments in North Carolina
Populated places established in 1739